The Canadian Screen Award for Best Performance in a Children's or Youth Program or Series is a Canadian Screen Award that honours performances in English language children's television produced in Canada.

Winners and nominees 
Winners in bold.

1990s

1993
  Graham Greene - The Adventures of Dudley the Dragon ("Mr. Crabby Tree")
 Fred Penner - Fred Penner's Place ("Swinging")
 Michelle Beaudoin - Madison ("The Fire Fighter")
 Ernie Coombs - Mr. Dressup's 25th Anniversary
 Jackie Burroughs - The Adventures of Dudley the Dragon ("High Flying Dragon")
 Alyson Court - The Big Comfy Couch ("Funny Faces")

1994
  Laura Bertram - Ready or Not ("Am I Perverted or What?")
 Tina Keeper - For Angela
 Shawn Ashmore - Guitarman
 Enuka Okuma - Madison ("The Girl Most Likely")
 Denny Doherty - Theodore Tugboat ("George Ghost")

1995
  Ernie Coombs - Mr. Dressup ("It Goes On Top")
 John Acorn - Acorn, the Nature Nut ("The Fast and Furious World of Tiger Beetles")
 Daniel DeSanto - Eric's World ("Horace in Love")
 Jan Rubeš - Lamb Chop in the Haunted Studio
 Laura Bertram - Ready or Not ("Crater Face")

1996
 Callum Keith Rennie - My Life as a Dog ("The Puck Stops Here")
 Ben Foster - Flash Forward ("House Party")
 Kathryn Long - Goosebumps ("The Haunted Mask")
 Shari Lewis - Lamb Chop's Special Chanukah

1997
  Laura Bertram - Ready or Not ("Graduation")
 Ben Foster - Flash Forward ("Presents")
 Jewel Staite - Flash Forward ("Curtain Call")
 Jonathan Torrens - Jonovision ("What Happened To You?")
 Meredith Henderson - The Adventures of Shirley Holmes ("The Case of the Second Sight")

1998
  Sarah Polley - Straight Up ("Mortifying")
 Jonathan Torrens - Jonovision ("Obnoxious Couples")
 Merwin Mondesir - Straight Up ("Façade")
 Kevin Brauch - Stuff ("Triathlon")
 Michael Moriarty - The Inventors' Specials ("Galileo: On the Shoulders of Giants")
 Chris Wiggins - The Rink

1999
  Meredith Henderson - The Adventures of Shirley Holmes ("The Case of the Crooked Comic")
 Jonathan Torrens - Jonovision ("Jonopalooza")
 Corey Sévier - Lassie ("Full Circle")
 Maurice Dean Wint - The Sweetest Gift
 Brent Carver - Whiskers

2000s

2000
  Matt Frewer - Mentors ("A Transient, Shining Trouble")
 Patty Sullivan - Let's Get Real ("Life at School")
 Elliot Page - Pit Pony ("Homecoming")
 Andrew Bush, Nikki Barnett, Kim D'Eon, Duane Hall, and Michael Scholar Jr. - Street Cents ("Music")
 Thomas Jay Ryan - The Artists' Specials ("Degas and the Dancer")

2001
  Brendan Fletcher - Caitlin's Way ("The Easy Way")
 Lindsay Felton - Caitlin's Way ("The Present, Part 1")
 Vanessa King - Edgemont ("This Song's For You")
 Tyler Kyte - Popular Mechanics For Kids ("In Deep Water")
 Lee Thompson Young - The Famous Jett Jackson ("On the Reel")

2002
  Gordon Greene - The Famous Jett Jackson ("Heroes")
 Eric Peterson - Screech Owls
 Gary Farmer - Screech Owls ("Sacred Ground")
 Jonathan Malen - Screech Owls ("Face Off")
 Mark Rendall - Tales from the Neverending Story

2003
  Jake Epstein - Degrassi: The Next Generation ("Tears Are Not Enough")
 Kristin Kreuk - Edgemont ("The Cold Light of Dawn")
 Dominic Zamprogna - Edgemont ("The Cold Light of Dawn")
 Stephen Ouimette - Mentors ("Such Stuff as Dreams Are Made On")
 Alison Pill - The Dinosaur Hunter

2004
  Elliot Page - Mrs. Ashboro's Cat
 Jake Epstein - Degrassi: The Next Generation ("Should I Stay or Should I Go")
 Tom Barnett - Mrs. Ashboro's Cat
 Ali Mukaddam - Radio Free Roscoe ("The Awful Truth")
 Lauren Collins - renegadepress.com ("Skin Deep")

2005
  Ksenia Solo - renegadepress.com ("Can You See Me Now")
 Laurence Leboeuf - 15/Love ("Ghost of a Chance")
 Alexz Johnson - Instant Star ("Won't Get Fooled Again")
 Tatiana Maslany - renegadepress.com ("Giving Yourself Away")
 Tasha Pelletier - renegadepress.com ("Union")
 Daniel Cook - This Is Daniel Cook ("This is Daniel Cook Doing Magic")

2006
  Ksenia Solo - renegadepress.com ("Fear")
 Meaghan Rath - 15/Love ("Comfort Zone")
 Paula Brancati - Dark Oracle ("Life Interrupted")
 Michael Seater - Life with Derek ("Grade-Point: Average")
 Ishan Davé - renegadepress.com ("This is your Brain on Love")

2007
  Shenae Grimes - Degrassi: The Next Generation ("Eyes Without a Face Part 2")
 Alexz Johnson - Instant Star ("I Fought the Law")
 Magda Apanowicz - renegadepress.com ("Blackout" aka "Getting it Right")
 Bronson Pelletier - renegadepress.com ("The Third Wheel")
 Ishan Davé - renegadepress.com ("Sullengirl16")

2008
  Alexz Johnson - Instant Star ("Let it Be")
 Lauren Collins - Degrassi: The Next Generation ("Talking in Your Sleep")
 Shane Kippel - Degrassi: The Next Generation ("Death or Glory Part 2")
 Ashley Leggat - Life with Derek ("Allergy Season")
 Magda Apanowicz - renegadepress.com ("Life Today")

2009
  Michael Seater - Life with Derek ("Happy New School Year")
 Paula Brancati - Degrassi: The Next Generation ("Fight the Power")
 Stacey Farber - Degrassi: The Next Generation ("Paradise City - Part 3")
 Ali Eisner - Kids' Canada ("Favourite Foods")

2010s

2010
  Charlotte Arnold - Degrassi: The Next Generation ("Somebody")
 Landon Liboiron - Degrassi: The Next Generation ("Waiting For a Girl Like You")
 Melinda Shankar - How to Be Indie ("How to Beat Father Time")
 Jamie Watson - Peep and the Big Wide World ("Magic Duck Dancing / Chirp Chirp, Tweet, Tweet, Chirp")
 Kayla Lorette - That's So Weird! ("Leaky Roof")

2011
  Jordan Todosey - Degrassi: The Next Generation ("My Body Is a Cage, Part 2")
 Ali Eisner - Kids' Canada ("Wowie Woah Woah")
 Munro Chambers - The Latest Buzz ("The Extreme Shakespeare Issue")
 Ashley Leggat - Vacation with Derek
 Kate Trotter - Vacation with Derek

2012
  Melinda Shankar - How to Be Indie ("How to Be the Hero")
 Charlotte Arnold - Degrassi ("Rock your Body" part 2)
 Dylan Everett - Degrassi ("Rusty Cage" part 2)
 Jahmil French - Degrassi ("Smash Into You")
 Aislinn Paul - Degrassi ("Waterfalls" part 2)

2013
  Dylan Everett - Degrassi ("Bitter Sweet Symphony" part 1)
 Munro Chambers - Degrassi ("Ray of Light" part 2)
 Michael Murphy - Life with Boys ("Young and Stupid with Boys")
 Brendan Meyer - Mr. Young ("Mr. Time")
 Dylan Everett - Wingin it ("Forget about it")

2014
  Aislinn Paul - Degrassi ("My Own Worst Enemy")
 Richard Harmon - If I Had Wings
 Charlie Storwick - Some Assembly Required ("Realm of Raiders")
 Brittany Raymond - The Next Step ("What'll I Do")
 Christian Potenza - Total Drama All-Stars ("Heroes Vs. Villains")

2015
  Aislinn Paul - Degrassi ("Give Me One Reason")
 Ana Golja - Full Out
 Jordan Lockhart - Hi Opie! ("Not Ms. Doney")
 Dalila Bela - Odd Squad ("Training Day")
 Madison Ferguson - The Stanley Dynamic ("Stanley Sick Day")

2016
  Brittany Raymond - The Next Step
 Addison Holley - Annedroids
 Jordan Lockhart - Hi Opie!
 Jeni Ross - Lost & Found Music Studios
 Sean Michael Kyer - Odd Squad

2017
 Ella Ballentine, L.M. Montgomery's Anne of Green Gables: Fire and Dew
Amanda Arcuri, Degrassi: Next Class
Anna Cathcart, Odd Squad
Akiel Julien, The Next Step
Michela Luci, Dino Dana

2018
 Anna Cathcart, Odd Squad
Saara Chaudry, Dino Dana
Millie Davis, Odd Squad
Isaac Kragten, Odd Squad
Michela Luci, Dino Dana

2019
 Saara Chaudry, Dino Dana
Saara Chaudry, Holly Hobbie
Hunter Dillon, Holly Hobbie
Kate Moyer, Holly Hobbie
Tomaso Sanelli, Creeped Out

2020s

2020
 Saara Chaudry, Dino Dana
Lilly Bartlam, Detention Adventure
Ruby Jay, Holly Hobbie
Simone Miller, Detention Adventure
Tomaso Sanelli, Detention Adventure

2021
  Saara Chaudry, Lockdown
Kamaia Fairburn, Endlings
Valentina Herrera, Odd Squad Mobile Unit
Alyssa Hidalgo, Odd Squad Mobile Unit
Michela Luci, Endlings

2022
Lilly Bartlam, Detention Adventure
Saara Chaudry, Holly Hobbie
Melanie Doane, Ukulele U
Jack Fulton, Detention Adventure
Alyssa Hidalgo, Odd Squad Mobile Unit
Simone Miller, Detention Adventure
Alina Prijono, Detention Adventure
Tomaso Sanelli, Detention Adventure

Best Performance in a Pre-School Program or Series

1990s

1997
  Graham Greene - The Adventures of Dudley the Dragon ("Dudley and the Tiny Raincloud")
 John Pattison - Groundling Marsh ("Bah Hegdish")
 Taborah Johnson and Bob Dermer - Guess What? ("Frogs & Toads")

1998
  Rick Mercer - The Adventures of Dudley the Dragon ("The Last Dudley")
 Mary Walsh - The Adventures of Dudley the Dragon ("Mr. Crabby Tree Falls in Love")
 Daniel Kash - The Adventures of Dudley the Dragon ("The Boy Who Cried Witch")
 Sheila McCarthy - The Adventures of Dudley the Dragon ("The Pumpkin King")
 Shari Lewis - The Charlie Horse Music Pizza ("My Dog Has Fleas")

1999
  Jayne Eastwood - Noddy ("The Trouble with Truman")
 Sean McCann - Noddy ("The Trouble with Truman")
 Robert Mills - Ruffus the Dog ("Around the World in 80 Days")
 James Rankin - Scoop and Doozie ("Take the Cake")
 Bob Stutt - Sesame Park ("Episode 43")

2000s

2000
  Sheila McCarthy - Sesame Park ("Little Miss Muffet")
 Jayne Eastwood - Noddy ("Be Patient")
 Sean McCann - Noddy ("Slugger")
 Robert Mills - Ruffus the Dog ("Troll Under the Bridge")
 James Rankin - Scoop and Doozie ("Pie in the Sky")
 Pier Kohl - Sesame Park ("Little Miss Muffet")

2001
  Eric Peterson -  Sesame Park ("Old King Cole")
 Natasha LaForce - Polkaroo's Awesome ABCs ("The Not-So-Quiet Letter Q")
 James Rankin - Scoop and Doozie ("Mad As A Dozer")
 Pier Kohl - Sesame Park ("Louis At the Big Hill")
 Gisèle Corinthios - The Nook Counting Network ("9 Trucks")

2002
  James Rankin - Scoop and Doozie ("Boo Who?")
 Alyson Court and Michael Clarke - Get Set For Life
 Charles Schott - Polka Dot Shorts
 Chris Knight - Scoop and Doozie
 Gillie Robic, John Eccleston, Rebecca Nagan, Wim Booth, Don Austen, Julie Westwood, Brian Herring - The Hoobs ("Rings")
 Gisèle Corinthios - The Nook Counting Network ("Jelly Donuts")

2003
  Pier Kohl, Timothy Gosley, Jani Lauzon, Julie Burroughs, André Meunier, France Chevrette and Hugolin Chevrette Landesque - Wumpa's World ("Seal Got Your Tongue") 
 Gillie Robic, Rebecca Nagan, Wim Booth, Don Austen, Julie Westwood, Brian Herring, Mark Jeffries - The Hoobs ("Beautiful")
 Sayaka Karasugi, Elizabeth Olds, Jorden Morris, Keir Knight, Rick Jones, Jennifer Welsman - The Toy Castle ("Snowflakes/Ballerina Big Top/Little Rag Doll")

2004
  Jason Hopley and Jamie Shannon - Nanalan' ("Free")
 Alyson Court - The Big Comfy Couch ("Clowning in the Rain")
 Gillie Robic, Rebecca Nagan, Wim Booth, Don Austen, Julie Westwood, Mark Jeffris, and John Eccleston - The Hoobs ("Opera Singer")

References 

Performance children